Richard Henry Austin Swain FRSE FRCPE FRCPath (6 February 1910 – 11 May 1981) was a British virologist, bacteriologist and pathologist. He was fondly known as Dick Swain.

Life
He was born in Wimbledon on 6 February 1910, the son of master builder, Charles Henry Swain. He was educated at Cheltonian College and Dulwich College, going on to study medicine at the University of Cambridge.

In 1939 he began as a demonstrator in pathology at St Bartholomew's Hospital, London. In 1942 he joined the Royal Army Medical Corps and served as a military pathologist with the Central Mediterranean Forces. He was demobbed in 1946. In 1949 he joined the University of Edinburgh as lecturer then reader in pathology and virology. In 1949 he was elected an Fellow of the Royal Society of Edinburgh. His proposers were Thomas J. Mackie, James Pickering Kendall, Alexander Murray Drennan and John Gaddum.

He died in Edinburgh on 11 May 1981.

Family

He married Margaret Helen Hart. They were parents to Catherine Fiona Swain.

Publications

Clinical Virology (1967)
Medical Microbiology (joint author)

References

1910 births
1981 deaths
People educated at Dulwich College
Alumni of the University of Cambridge
British virologists
Fellows of the Royal Society of Edinburgh